Ottawa Electric Railway Company was a streetcar public transit system in the city of Ottawa, Canada, part of the electric railway streetcars that operated between 1891 and 1959.  Ottawa once had tracks through downtown on Rideau Street, Sparks Street and others, and extended outside of the downtown core to provide services that helped form communities such as Westboro, Old Ottawa South and The Glebe.  Prior to this, starting in 1866, public transportation was provided by Ottawa City Passenger Railway Company, a horse-drawn tram service. The O.E.R. was taken over by the Ottawa Transportation Commission in 1948, which was itself succeeded by OC Transpo in 1973.

History

Ottawa City Passenger Railway Company

Preceding the use of electric streetcars, Ottawa's first public transportation system was the operation of a horsecar system.  Tramway service began in July 1870. under the Ottawa City Passenger Railway Company, which was incorporated on August 15, 1866.

The O.C.P.R. was financed largely by the estate of Thomas McKay (an early founder of Ottawa).  In 1868, Thomas Reynolds bought control of the company intending to use it to transport lumber at night from the Chaudiere mills to McTaggart Street, the terminal of the St. Lawrence and Ottawa Railway.  In 1871, Reynolds sold his streetcar company interest to Thomas Keifer.

The horse-drawn streetcars travelled back and forth from New Edinburgh to the Chaudière Bridge.  The trams for passengers and freight had a line extending from Rideau Falls in New Edinburgh, to Sussex, Sparks, Wellington, Duke (in Lebreton Flats) and the Suspension Bridge.  The service provided sleighs in the winter and had 273,000 passengers in its first year of operation.  In 1891, it had  of track, 25 horses and 15 employees.

The Ottawa City Passenger Railway Company had tram cars holding 20 passengers which were made of wood with bench seats.  The company applied to the city to convert to electricity but was refused, and later it proposed a merger of two companies.

A new company, Ottawa Electric Railway Company, would appear on the scene in the early 1890s and would later dominate public transportation in Ottawa.

Electricity in Ottawa

Ottawa's first electric lights operated near the Chaudière Falls in 1882, and in 1885, electric lighting came to the city streets under Ottawa Electric Light Company.

Thomas Ahearn, born in LeBreton Flats, also became an important figure in the early years of electricity in Ottawa.  Ahearn had been a telegraph operator, and in 1892 filed patents for both an "electric oven" and a "system of warming cars by means of electrically heated water".  Ahearn formed a partnership with Warren Y. Soper, and for years the office of Ahearn and Soper was on Sparks Street.  Ahearn merged existing companies (Clemow's) Ottawa Electric Light Company, and Ahearn's company, Chaudière Electric Light and Power Company, with a third company, naming it Ottawa Electric Company.  It became part of Ahearn's Ottawa Light, Heat and Power Company, which eventually was taken over by Ottawa Hydro.

In 1901, Ottawa Electric Railway Company built a  canal just north of the Britannia Boathouse Club to generate Hydroelectric power on the Deschênes Rapids. Although the hydroelectric project was abandoned as unfeasible, the unfinished canal was used in 1951 by Past Commodores Thomas G. Fuller and Reginald G. Bruce with labour provided by volunteer Club members as the basis of the Britannia Yacht Club`s protected harbour. Today, the main and inner harbour provide 250 wet moorings, fuel and pumpout facilities, for both sail and power boats.

Ottawa Electric Railway Company

The horsecar was providing public transportation for Ottawa into the 1890s when, for a short time, electric streetcars were also employed.  Initially Thomas Ahearn's new company started streetcar operations until it was merged with the existing horsecar company, and in the process, it was renamed to the Ottawa Electric Railway Company.

In 1890 Mayor Howland of Toronto offered to provide Ottawa with an electric streetcar service.  He backed out and Ahearn stepped in, and he along with Soper petitioned the city in order to obtain the franchise. They succeeded, and got granted a 20-year charter for on November 5, 1890, city council gave them permission to operate an electric railway.  They formed a company on February 13, 1891 called the Ottawa Electric Street Railway Company(sic).

On June 25, 1891 the first electric street cars began operation in a display of five (four on June 29) streetcars with Ahearn and Soper as drivers.  Mayor Thomas Birkett was aboard, as well as some dignitaries  and they ran to the exhibition grounds on Bank Street.

The Ottawa City Passenger Railway Company was amalgamated with the Ottawa Electric Street Railway Company in 1893. The merger took place resulting in the formation of a new company; on June 28 the Ottawa Electric Railway Company was incorporated.  O.E.R. purchased W. W. Wylie Carriage Works in 1893 and started making its own cars.  Patterson and Corbin of St. Catharines provided ten trams. In the winter, some of the fleet was equipped with plows and rotating brushes to clear the track.  In 1893 three cars had heaters.  Later models were equipped with underfloor heaters; the first heated tramcars on the continent.  This company operated in conjunction with the Ottawa Transportation Company, which was granted a charter in 1892 (which would last until February 21, 1942.)

Its first tracks started from Broad Street Station (in LeBreton Flats) to Albert and Metcalfe, then to the exhibition grounds via Bank Street, to the Protestant Hospital at Charlotte and Rideau, to Wellington and Rideau, the Canada Atlantic Station at the end of Elgin to Sparks and Metcalfe.  Street cars allowed access to areas such as Britannia Park, Rockliffe Park and Queen's Park in Aylmer.

In the city's first eleven months of electric streetcar service, it had a ridership of 1.5 million whereas the horse tramway had 575,000.  The city agreed to a 30-year electric railway in 1893 following which the horse tramways disappeared.  The city for years renewed the charter rather than exercising its right to purchase the company's property.

By 1900, Ottawa Electric Railway had a double-tracked line to Britannia Bay.  Sunday service started in 1900 despite strong protests from citizens wanting to maintain the Sunday as a Sabbath Day. The Alexandra Bridge opened for traffic on February 22, 1901 by the Ottawa Northern and Western Railway Company to bring service from Waltham and Maniwaki  After the Alexandra Bridge was built, it was employed with the O.E.R.  The Alexandra Bridge had a single track for steam trains, and two tracks for electric trams and two roadways for cars and two footpaths.

In 1924, fares were five cents; 3 cents for children.  The O.E.R. introduced buses in 1924 but they were removed, only returning in 1939 (for a service between Elgin and Ottawa East).  In August 1948, city council finally agreed to purchase the company's assets.  The city bought the O.E.R. for $6.3 million in 1950.  The Ottawa Transportation Commission was set up to operate it and 54 million passengers rode in 1950.

By 1958 financial problems of the O.T.C. caused a study to be conducted by Urwick, Currie Ltd.  In March 1958, they acknowledged the 96 aging cars and recommended diesel buses.  The Ottawa Transportation Commission began implementing the plan and removed the cars; the last electric car ran on May 1, 1959 when the Britannia line was closed.  A parade was held on May 4 celebrating an end to 68 years of tram service in Ottawa.  The O.T.C. was succeeded by OC Transpo in 1973.

Fleet

Gallery

See also

Confederation Line
C. T. Bate president of the Ottawa Electric Street Company.
E. A. Bourque squired the purchase of the Ottawa Electric Railway, that became Ottawa Transportation Commission.
Henry Herbert Horsey a director of Ottawa Light, Heat and Power Company and the Ottawa Electric Railway Company.
List of street railways in Canada
Lornado, home of Warren Y. Soper, it is still there, and is now the US Ambassador's home.
OC Transpo
 O-Train
 Ottawa Car Company
Ottawa Transportation Commission
Robert Blackburn (politician) helped establish the Ottawa City Passenger Railway Company.
The Glebe A community which grew from this streetcar line.
Thomas Ahearn founder and president of the Ottawa Electric Railway Company, founded Ahearn & Soper.
 Trillium Line
Vimy House Ottawa's streetcar garage is still there near the Canadian War Museum.
Westboro A community which grew from this streetcar line.
William Goodhue Perley helped establish the Ottawa City Passenger Railway Company.
William H. Hutchison director of the Chaudiere Electric Light Company, the Ottawa City Passenger Railway Company, the Ottawa Electric Railway Company.
 List of Ontario railways
 List of defunct Canadian railways

References

Bibliography

Further reading

1891 establishments in Ontario
Light rail in Canada
Railway lines closed in 1959
Railway lines opened in 1891
Rail transport in Ottawa
Street railways in Ontario
Ottawa
Electric railways in Canada